Shapley is a lunar impact crater that lies along the southern edge of Mare Crisium. It was named after American astronomer Harlow Shapley. It was previously designated Picard H. However the crater Picard lies about 150 kilometers to the north-northwest across the Mare Crisium. Somewhat closer to this crater are Tebbutt to the west, and Firmicus to the east-southeast.

This crater is roughly circular, but appears somewhat oval when viewed from the Earth due to foreshortening. The interior wall is slightly wider in the southern half, and the outer ridge is attached to a ridge that leads to the south then southeast. The interior floor has a dark hue that matches the adjacent lunar mare, having a lower albedo than the terrain to the south. There is a low central peak near the midpoint of the floor.

See also 
 1123 Shapleya, minor planet
 Shapley Supercluster

References

External links

 LTO-62A3 Shapley — L&PI topographic map

Impact craters on the Moon